Two Moons (1847–1917), or Ishaynishus (Cheyenne: Éše'he Ôhnéšesêstse), was one of the Cheyenne chiefs who took part in the Battle of the Little Bighorn and other battles against the United States Army.

Life
Two Moons was the son of Carries the Otter, an Arikara captive who married into the Cheyenne tribe. Perhaps known best for his participation in battles such as the Battle of the Rosebud against General Crook on June 17, 1876, in the Montana Territory, the Battle of Little Big Horn on June 25, 1876 and what would prove to be his last battle, the Battle of Wolf Mountain on January 8, 1877. Two Moons' defeat at Wolf Mountain by General Nelson A. Miles led inevitably to the surrender of his Cheyenne band to Miles at Fort Keogh in April 1877.

After the surrender of his Cheyenne band, Two Moons enlisted as an Indian Scout under General Miles. As a result of Two Moons' pleasant personality, the friendliness that he showed towards the whites, as well as his ability to get along with the military, General Miles appointed him head Chief of the Cheyenne Northern Reservation. As head Chief, Two Moons played a crucial role in the surrender of Chief Little Cow's Cheyenne band at Fort Keogh.

Northern Cheyenne Reservation

Two Moons traveled on multiple occasions to Washington, D.C., to discuss and fight for the future of the Northern Cheyenne people and to better the conditions that existed on the reservation. In 1914, Two Moons met with President Woodrow Wilson to discuss these matters.

Two Moons was one of the models selected for James Fraser's famous Buffalo Nickel.

Death
Two Moons died in 1917 at his home in Montana at the age of 70. Two Moons' grave still lies alongside U.S. Route 212, west of Busby, Montana.

References

Time Life Books. (1993). The Wild West. Time Life Books.
Richard G. Hardorff, Cheyenne memories of the Custer fight, University of Nebraska Press, 1998 .

Native American leaders
Cheyenne people
People of the Great Sioux War of 1876
1847 births
1917 deaths
People of pre-statehood Montana
Burials in Montana
Battle of the Little Bighorn